Andrew Frank Sisco (born January 13, 1983) is an American former professional baseball pitcher. He has played in Major League Baseball for the Kansas City Royals and Chicago White Sox, in the Korean Professional Baseball League for the KT Wiz, and in the Chinese Professional Baseball League for the EDA Rhinos and the Brother Elephants.

Professional career

Kansas City Royals
Sisco was the Chicago Cubs second-round pick in the 2001 Major League Baseball draft.  He was selected to the Northwest League all-star team and short season A All-Star team as well as being named the short season player of the year, in 2002 with the Boise Hawks, when he was 7–2 with a 2.43 ERA in 14 starts.

Sisco was the second pick in the 2004 Rule 5 draft, taken by the Kansas City Royals from the Cubs organization. The Royals converted him to a relief pitcher. He made his Major League debut on April 4, 2005 against the Detroit Tigers, allowing two runs in 2 innings. Under the terms of Rule 5, Sisco remained on the Royals major league roster for the entire 2005 season so that he would not have to be offered back to the Cubs for $50,000. Sisco posted a 3.11 ERA in his rookie season for the Royals, but after struggling during the  season, the Royals sent Sisco to Triple-A Omaha.  They recalled him to Kansas City on August 8. His ERA rose to 7.10 in 2006.

Chicago White Sox
On December 16, 2006, Sisco was traded to the Chicago White Sox for Ross Gload. He appeared in 19 games for the White Sox, with an 8.36 ERA in 2007 and also made 23 appearances (15 starts) for the AAA Charlotte Knights.

Oakland Athletics
Following Tommy John surgery, Sisco was signed by the Oakland Athletics to a $550,000 minor-league contract in March 2009. Due to his lengthy recovery from the injury, he did not play in a game for the Athletics.

San Francisco Giants
On March 6, 2010, Sisco signed a minor league contract with the San Francisco Giants. He appeared in 48 games with the AA Richmond Flying Squirrels, where he was 4–4 with a 4.32 ERA.

New York Yankees
Sisco signed a minor league contract with an invitation to 2011 spring training with the New York Yankees. However, he did not make the team out of spring training. On May 27, Sisco was released after he had a 2–0 record and a 1.88 ERA in 16 games with the Scranton/Wilkes-Barre Yankees of the International League. He finished the season with the Piratas de Campeche in the Mexican Baseball League, where he was 1–2 with an 8.27 ERA with 10 appearances.

Los Angeles Dodgers
The Los Angeles Dodgers signed Sisco to a minor league contract on February 9, 2012.

E-DA Rhinos
In 2013, Sisco played the first half-season for the EDA Rhinos, a team in Taiwan's Chinese Professional Baseball League, where he is primarily used as a starting pitcher. Despite only playing for the first half, Sisco led the league in ERA with 2.70 in 133 and 1/3 innings.

In 2014, Sisco returned to the Rhinos with a one-year contract. That year, Sisco set the CPBL record for most strikeouts through a players first eight starts, with 67.

KT Wiz
Sisco signed with the KT Wiz of the Korea Baseball Organization for the 2015 season. On May 27, 2015, Sisco was released after struggling to a 0-6 record with a 6.23 in 39 innings with the club.

EDA Rhinos (second stint)
Sisco re-signed with the EDA Rhinos of the Chinese Professional Baseball League following his release from Korea. In 17 starts, Sisco got 6 wins, 7 losses and a 4.52 ERA.

Chinatrust Brothers
On March 29, 2016, Sisco signed with the Chinatrust Brothers of the CPBL. After a short stint in the farm league, Sisco was promoted to the active roster.

References

External links

Career statistics and player information from Korea Baseball Organization

1983 births
Living people
American expatriate baseball players in Mexico
American expatriate baseball players in South Korea
American expatriate baseball players in Taiwan
Arizona League Cubs players
Baseball players from Colorado
Boise Hawks players
Charlotte Knights players
Chicago White Sox players
Daytona Cubs players
EDA Rhinos players
Kansas City Royals players
KBO League pitchers
KT Wiz players
Lansing Lugnuts players
Major League Baseball pitchers
Mexican League baseball pitchers
Omaha Royals players
People from Steamboat Springs, Colorado
Piratas de Campeche players
Richmond Flying Squirrels players
Rojos del Águila de Veracruz players
Scranton/Wilkes-Barre Yankees players
Somerset Patriots players